Edon Lulzim Zhegrova (born 31 March 1999) is a professional footballer who plays as a right winger for Ligue 1 club Lille. Born in Germany, he plays for the Kosovo national team.

Club career

Early career
Zhegrova is a product of youth team systems of the different Kosovan and Belgian sides. In 2012, he was chosen as the best player of the Milan Junior Camp which was held in Kosovo.

Genk
On 22 March 2017, Zhegrova joined Belgian First Division A side Genk. On 10 September 2017, he made his debut in a 1–1 away draw against Gent after coming on as a substitute at 80th minute in place of Ruslan Malinovskyi.

Basel

Period on loan
On 4 February 2019, Genk announced the loan of Zhegrova to Swiss Super League side Basel. On the same day later, the Swiss club confirmed that he had joined on a one and a half season loan contract and received squad number 30. On 23 February 2019, he made his debut in a 2–0 away win against Neuchâtel Xamax after coming on as a substitute at 83rd minute in place of Valentin Stocker. He scored his first goal for his new club on 25 September 2019 in the home match in the St. Jakob Stadium against Zürich as Basel won 4–0. It was the third goal of the game.

Return as a permanent player
On 22 September 2020, Zhegrova signed a three-year contract with Swiss Super League club Basel and received squad number 30. Five days later, he made his debut in a 1–0 away win against Servette after being named in the starting line-up. Seven days after debut, Zhegrova scored his first goal for Basel in his third appearance for the club in a 3–2 home win over Luzern in Swiss Super League.

On 14 January the club announced that Zhegrova had transferred out and signed for French team Lille OSC for undisclosed fee. During his three years with the club from January 2019 to January 2022 Zhegrova played a total of 89 games for Basel scoring a total of 15 goals. 60 of these games were in the Swiss Super League, 3 in the Swiss Cup, 11 in the Europa League and Conference League and 15 were friendly games. He scored 9 goals in the domestic league, 2 in the Conference League and the other 4 were scored during the test games.

Lille
On 14 January 2022, Zhegrova signed a four-year contract with Ligue 1 club Lille and received squad number 23. Lille reportedly paid a €7 million transfer fee. Eight days later, he was named as a Lille substitute for the first time in a league match against Brest. His debut with Lille came on 6 February in a 1–5 home defeat against Paris Saint-Germain after coming on as a substitute at 85th minute in place of Jonathan Bamba. One month after debut, Zhegrova scored his first goal for Lille in his fourth appearance for the club in a 4–0 home win over Clermont in Ligue 1.

International career
In August 2017, Zhegrova refused a call-up from Kosovo U21 with the pretense that it's important for him to concentrate on playing at the club level for now. On 6 March 2018, he finally decides to play with Kosovo. Thirteen days later, Zhegrova received a call-up from Kosovo for friendly matches against Madagascar and Burkina Faso. Five days after the call-up, he made his debut with Kosovo in a friendly match against Madagascar after being named in the starting line-up and scored his side's only goal during a 1–0 home win.

Personal life
Zhegrova was born in Herford, Germany to Kosovan parents from the village Dobrajë e Madhe of Lipjan, which later would be his temporary residence after his family returned to Kosovo's capital, Pristina, after the end of Kosovo War. Zhegrova's younger sister, Valza is a singer.

Career statistics

Club

International

Scores and results list Kosovo's goal tally first, score column indicates score after each Zhegrova goal.

References

External links

1999 births
Living people
People from Lipljan
Kosovan footballers
Kosovo international footballers
Kosovan expatriate footballers
Expatriate footballers in Belgium
Kosovan expatriate sportspeople in Belgium
Expatriate footballers in Switzerland
Kosovan expatriate sportspeople in Switzerland
Expatriate footballers in France
Kosovan expatriate sportspeople in France
Association football wingers
Belgian Pro League players
K.R.C. Genk players
Swiss Super League players
FC Basel players
Ligue 1 players
Lille OSC players